Epigytholus is a monotypic genus of Asian dwarf spiders containing the single species, Epigytholus kaszabi. It was first described by A. V. Tanasevitch in 1996, and has only been found in Mongolia and Russia.

See also
 List of Linyphiidae species (A–H)

References

Linyphiidae
Monotypic Araneomorphae genera
Spiders of Asia
Spiders of Russia